The HM7B is a European cryogenic upper stage rocket engine used on the vehicles in the Ariane rocket family. It will be replaced by Vinci, which will act as the new upper stage engine on Ariane 6. Nearly 300 engines have been produced to date.

History
The development of HM7 engine begun in 1973 on a base of HM4 rocket engine. It was designed to power a third stage of newly constructed Ariane 1, the first launch system for European Space Agency. Maiden flight took place on 24 December 1979 successfully placing CAT-1 satellite on the orbit. With the later introduction of Ariane 2 and Ariane 3 it became necessary to improve the performance of the upper stage engine. This was achieved by extending the nozzle length and increasing the chamber pressure from 30 to 35 bar, increasing the engine's specific impulse and resulting in a nominal burn time increase from 570 to 735 seconds. Qualification tests were completed in 1983 and this upgraded variant was designated HM7B. It was also used on the Ariane 4 vehicle's upper stage where the burn time was further increased to 780 seconds, and since 12 February 2005 it's also used on the upper stage of Ariane 5 ECA.

Overview
The HM7B is a regeneratively cooled gas generator rocket engine fed with liquid oxygen and liquid hydrogen. It has no restart capability: the engine is continuously fired for 950 seconds in its Ariane 5 version (780 s in the Ariane 4). It provides 62.7 kN of thrust with a specific impulse of 444.6 s. The engine's chamber pressure is 3.5 MPa.

See also
 Spacecraft propulsion
 Timeline of hydrogen technologies
 Comparison of orbital rocket engines
 HM4

Comparable engines
 YF-75
 RL-10
 Vinci
 CE-7.5

References

Spacecraft propulsion
Rocket engines using hydrogen propellant
Space program of France
Rocket engines using the gas-generator cycle